Georg Abels (2 October 1898 Pärnu – 30 October 1967 Tallinn) was an Estonian politician. He was a member of the II Riigikogu.

He was not originally elected as a member of II Riigikogu, but he become a member to subsistute Jaan Tomp.

Acknowldgements
Order of Lenin (1950) 
1964 Meritorious Cultural Figure of the Estonian SSR (1964)

References

1898 births
1967 deaths
Politicians from Pärnu
People from Kreis Pernau
Workers' United Front politicians
Estonian communists
Communist Party of Estonia politicians
Members of the Central Committee of the Communist Party of Estonia
People's commissars and ministers of the Estonian Soviet Socialist Republic
Members of the Riigikogu, 1923–1926
Members of the Supreme Soviet of the Estonian Soviet Socialist Republic, 1940–1947
Members of the Supreme Soviet of the Estonian Soviet Socialist Republic, 1947–1951
Members of the Supreme Soviet of the Estonian Soviet Socialist Republic, 1951–1955
Members of the Supreme Soviet of the Estonian Soviet Socialist Republic, 1955–1959
Members of the Supreme Soviet of the Estonian Soviet Socialist Republic, 1959–1963
Prisoners and detainees of Estonia
Recipients of the Order of Lenin
Burials at Metsakalmistu